The 1989 Green Bay Packers season was their 71st overall and their 69th in the National Football League. The Packers finished with a 10–6 record, their best since 1972, but failed to make the playoffs. The team was often referred to as "The Cardiac Pack" due to several close-game wins. The 1989 Packers hold the NFL record for most one-point victories in a season with four. The team was coached by Lindy Infante and led by quarterback Don Majkowski, who attained his nickname "The Majik Man."

Offseason 
The Green Bay Packers selected Tony Mandarich with their first pick of the 1989 NFL draft, passing on prospects such as Barry Sanders, Derrick Thomas, and Deion Sanders. Mandarich was a first-team All-American, an Outland Award finalist and a two-time Big Ten Lineman of the Year. Mandarich would later hold out most of the preseason, playing most of the regular season on special teams. Four years after signing Mandarich, the Packers cut him. ESPN rated Mandarich as the third biggest sports flop in the past 25 years.

Personnel

Staff

Roster

Regular season 
Although the Packers failed to make the Playoffs, they recorded their best record since 1972. The Packers finished 10–6, placing them second in the NFC Central. The Minnesota Vikings also finished 10–6, but held the tiebreaker due to a better conference record. The team finished with a 10–6 record for their first winning season since the strike shortened the 1982 season. It was also the first club to record 4 1-point victories in a season. The club was 6–2 at home and 4–4 on the road. The Packers offense had success due to a strong passing game, headed by quarterback Don Majkowski. Majkowski finished first in the NFL in passing yards and completions. He earned a bid to the NFL Pro Bowl. Wide receiver Sterling Sharpe finished the season first in receptions, and second in receiving yards and receiving touchdowns. Sharpe would also earn a bid to the Pro Bowl.

The Herschel Walker trade and the Packers 
On October 8, 1989, the Packers hosted the Dallas Cowboys, featuring star running back Herschel Walker. Four days later, the Cowboys traded Walker to the Minnesota Vikings, the next team on the Packers' schedule. Walker's debut with the Vikings occurred three days after the trade, on October 15, 1989, against the Packers. The Packers faced Walker for a third time during the regular season, on November 26, 1989, when the Packers played the Vikings again. These regular season games between the Packers and Walker occurred in three different cities: Green Bay, Minneapolis, and Milwaukee.

The Instant Replay game 

On November 5, 1989, the Packers beat the Bears 14–13, but not without controversy. Don Majkowski led the Packers to a comeback and a game-winning touchdown pass to Sterling Sharpe with less than a minute left to play. Initially the play was called a touchdown, but line judge Jim Quirk had called a penalty on Majkowski for being beyond the line of scrimmage when he threw the pass. With a nervous and tense crowd at Lambeau Field, the call went up to the instant replay official, Bill Parkinson. Several minutes later the call came down and the touchdown was awarded as recorded by instant replay. The Lambeau faithful and Packer players erupted with joy because it marked the first time since 1984 that the Packers had beaten their long-time rivals. The Packers would later beat the Bears again in the season. The game was broadcast on CBS with Dick Stockton and Dan Fouts on the call.

The last team to beat San Francisco 
On November 19, 1989, the Packers traveled to Candlestick Park and beat Joe Montana and the San Francisco 49ers. It would be one of only two losses for the 49ers, and the last before the 49ers finished out the season 8–0, including a 55–10 victory over the Denver Broncos in Super Bowl XXIV. In that game, the Packers matched their win total from the previous season (4–12). Although regarded at the time as a fluke, Green Bay would proceed to win 13 of the next 15 contests with San Francisco over the next 21 seasons.

Schedule 

Note: Intra-division opponents are in bold text.

Season summary

Week 1: vs. Tampa Bay Buccaneers

Week 5: vs. Dallas Cowboys

Week 9

Week 14: vs. Kansas City Chiefs

Week 15 at Chicago Bears

Standings

Season statistical leaders 
 Passing yards: Don Majkowski 4,318 yards
 Passing touchdowns: Don Majkowski 27 TDs
 Rushing yards: Brent Fullwood, 821 yards
 Rushing touchdowns: Brent Fullwood, 5 TDs
 Receiving yards: Sterling Sharpe, 1,423 yards
 Receiving touchdowns: Sterling Sharpe, 12 TDs
 Points: Chris Jacke, 108 points
 Kickoff return yards: Vince Workman, 547 yards
 Punt return yards: Jeff Query, 247 yards
 Sacks: Tim Harris, 19.5 sacks
 Interceptions: Dave Brown, 6 interceptions

Awards and records 
 Sterling Sharpe, NFL leader in receptions (90)
 Sterling Sharpe, second in NFL in receiving yards (1,423)

Milestones 
 Don Majkowski, first 4,000 yard passing season
 Sterling Sharpe, first 1,000 yard receiving season

Hall of Fame Inductions 
 In 1989 Packer great Willie Wood was inducted to the Pro Football Hall of Fame
 Zeke Bratkowski and Ron Kostelnik were inducted to the Green Bay Packers Hall of Fame

References

External links 
 1989 Green Bay Packers statistics  – Pro-Football-Reference
 1989 Green Bay Packers – Database Football

Green Bay Packers
Green Bay Packers seasons
1989 in sports in Wisconsin